Salix barrattiana is a species of flowering plant in the willow family known by the common name Barratt's willow. It is native to North America, where it is distributed across Alaska and western Canada, with also a few populations in Montana and Wyoming. These disjunct populations are probably relics from a time when the climate was colder.

This willow is a shrub reaching a maximum height near . It may form dense thickets. The stems are reddish-brown in color and the smaller branches may be purplish. The twigs are sticky with resin and have a coating of hairs. The leaves have a strong "balsamic" scent. The stipules and buds are very oily and will stain a pressing sheet yellow. The species is dioecious, with male and female reproductive parts on separate individuals. The catkins are "fuzzy".

This plant grows in fir and spruce forests and along rivers and streams. It can be found in boggy habitats and recent alluvial deposits. It is a tundra species.

This willow may hybridize with S. barclayi, S. commutata, and S. pseudomyrsinites.

This species is threatened by global climate change.

References

External links
The Nature Conservancy

barrattiana